The Rio Carauta stubfoot toad (Atelopus carauta) is a species of toad in the family Bufonidae endemic to Colombia; this anuran is found only within the Northwestern Andean montane forests. Its natural habitats are subtropical or tropical moist montane forests and rivers. The species is threatened by habitat loss.

References

Atelopus
Amphibians of Colombia
Endemic fauna of Colombia
Amphibians described in 1978
Taxonomy articles created by Polbot
Fauna of the northwestern Andean montane forests